The 2007–08 Romanian Hockey League season was the 78th season of the Romanian Hockey League. Eight teams participated in the league, and SC Miercurea Ciuc won the championship.

First round

Final round

Playoffs

Final
SC Miercurea Ciuc - HC Miercurea Ciuc 5-3, 4-2, 4-3 OT, 3-2

3rd place
CSA Steaua Bucuresti - Progym Gheorgheni 3-1, 7-1, 5-1

External links
Season on hockeyarchives.info

Romanian Hockey League seasons
Romanian
Rom